The Roseau–South Junction Border Crossing connects the cities of Roseau, Minnesota and South Junction, Manitoba on the Canada–United States border.  It is connected by Minnesota State Highway 310 in Roseau County on the American side and Manitoba Provincial Road 310 in the Rural Municipality of Piney on the Canadian side.  The crossing was established in 1948, and Canada is still using the border station it completed in 1953, which is located about a half mile north of the border.  The US rebuilt its border station in 2004.  The new facility includes an outdoor gun range.

See also
 List of Canada–United States border crossings

References 

Canada–United States border crossings
1948 establishments in Manitoba
1948 establishments in Minnesota
Buildings and structures in Roseau County, Minnesota